Janardan Tiwari  is an Indian politician. He was elected to the Lok Sabha, the lower house of the Parliament of India from  Siwan in Bihar as a member of the Bharatiya Janata Party.

References

External links
Official biographical sketch in Parliament of India website

Living people
1927 births
India MPs 1989–1991
Lok Sabha members from Bihar
Bharatiya Janata Party politicians from Bihar
Bihari politicians
People from Siwan, Bihar